Institute of Chartered Financial Analysts of India University, Jaipur (IUJ) was established under The ICFAI University, Jaipur Act, 2011 (Act No. 26 of 2011) passed by Legislative Assembly of Rajasthan. The university has been notified under Notification No. F. 2(26) Vidhi/2/2011 dated 22 September 2011. The University is sponsored by The ICFAI Society - a not-for-profit educational society established in 1984.

Programs
The ICFAI University, Jaipur offers career-oriented educational programs at doctoral, postgraduate, undergraduate and diploma programs in management, commerce, law and science & technology.

Bachelor of Technology Programs
 B.Tech. in civil engineering
 B.Tech. in electronic and communication engineering
 B.Tech. in computer science
 B.Tech. in mechanical engineering

 Bachelor of Commerce (B.Com.)
 Bachelor of Computer Application (BCA)
 Bachelor of Science (B.Sc.)

 BBA, LLB, MBA, Ph.D.

Regulatory recognitions
The ICFAI University Jaipur is recognized by University Grants Commission (UGC)
Member of the Association of Indian Universities (AIU)
The Bar Council of India (BCI) granted approval of affiliation for imparting Law programs.

Awards and recognitions

Most Promising Brand – Professional Education, 2014–15 – WBRC
SkillTree Great Place to study in India 2014–16 –SkillTree Knowledge Consortium
Leading Private University in India 2014–15 – Brand Academy Education Excellence Awards Education Evangelist of India 2013–14 –SkillTree Knowledge Consortium

References
‘’Livelaw’’, ICFAI University 1st National Moot Court Competition, 26 February 2009
"SiliconIndia MBA", 25 April 2012
"IUJaipur.edu.in", The ICFAI University, Jaipur Annual Report -2015-16

External links

Educational institutions established in 2011
Universities and colleges in Jaipur
Universities in Rajasthan
2011 establishments in Rajasthan